Rohini Nilekani (born 1960) is an Indian writer, author and philanthropist. She is the founder of Arghyam Foundation, a non-profit that focuses on water and sanitation issues, founded in 2001. She also chairs the Akshara Foundation, which focuses on elementary education. Nilekani serves as the co-founder and director of non-profit education platform, EkStep.

Early life 
Rohini grew up in a middle-class family in Mumbai, India. Her father was an engineer and her mother a homemaker. She holds a degree in French literature from Elphinstone College.

Career and work 
After completing her studies, Rohini started working as a reporter at the now-defunct Bombay Magazine in 1980 and later worked in Bangalore for Sunday magazine.

In 1998, she released her first novel, Stillborn, which was published by Penguin Books. Stillborn was a medical thriller novel and was well received by the readers. She has written and published her own children's stories, Sringeri Series, published by Pratham Books, a non-profit publisher of children's books, which she co-founded in 2004.

Her second book, Uncommon Ground, a nonfiction work based on her reporting as an anchor of the 2008 Indian TV program of the same name. Uncommon Ground was also published by Penguin Books in 2011. In 2001, Rohini Nilekani founded Arghyam Foundation, a non-profit that works on water and sanitation issues and is funded by her personal endowment.

Nilekani is on the board of trustees of Ashoka Trust for Research in Ecology and the Environment (ATREE). She serves on the Eminent Persons Advisory Group of the Competition Commission of India since May 2012. In July 2011, she was appointed as a member of the Audit Advisory Board of the Comptroller and Auditor General of India. She was inducted as a Foreign Honorary Member of the American Academy of Arts and Sciences in 2017.

She took retirement as the chairperson of the Arghyam Foundation in September 2021.

Published books

Philanthropy 
Nilekani is also a philanthropist and pledged 50 crores to Ashoka Trust for Research in Ecology and the Environment (ATREE). In December 2013, Rohini and her husband, Nandan Nilekani donated 50 crores to the National Council of Applied Economic Research to build a new India center at its New Delhi campus. In August 2013, she sold 5.77 lakh shares in Infosys to raise about 164 crores for philanthropic work. She was named as one of Asia's Heroes Of Philanthropy by Forbes Magazine in 2010 and 2014. She supports around 80 civil society organizations, working in climate change, gender equity, independent media, governance and the animal welfare sector. She won the Best Grassroots Philanthropist at Forbes India Leadership Awards in March 2022. She received the Philanthropist of the Year 2020-21 Award from the Associated Chambers of Commerce and Industry of India (ASSOCHAM).

Personal life 
Rohini is married to Nandan Nilekani. She met him at a quiz competition at her college in 1977. The couple has two children, Janhavi and Nihar.

References 

1960 births
Living people
Indian women writers
Indian women philanthropists
Indian philanthropists
People from Mumbai
People from Bangalore
Infosys people
Giving Pledgers
Indian social entrepreneurs
Indian women journalists
21st-century philanthropists
Elphinstone College alumni
St. Xavier's College, Mumbai alumni
21st-century women philanthropists